is a private university in Ako, Hyōgo, Japan, established in 1997.

External links
 Official website 

Educational institutions established in 1997
Private universities and colleges in Japan
Universities and colleges in Hyōgo Prefecture
Konkōkyō
1997 establishments in Japan
New religious movement universities and colleges